The DODX Guard Car No. G-56 is a historic railroad car at the Arkansas Railroad Museum in Pine Bluff, Arkansas.  It was built about 1942 by the American Car and Foundry Company, and is a rare surviving example of a World War II troop transport, and as a railroad guard car used by the United States Department of Defense in the management of hazardous and valuable cargos that it transported by rail.  The car is silver, with a horizontal black stripe on the side.

The car was listed on the National Register of Historic Places in 2007.

See also
National Register of Historic Places listings in Jefferson County, Arkansas

References

American Car and Foundry Company
Arkansas Railroad Museum
Buildings and structures completed in 1950
Individual locomotives of the United States
National Register of Historic Places in Pine Bluff, Arkansas
Railway vehicles on the National Register of Historic Places in Arkansas
Tourist attractions in Pine Bluff, Arkansas